In algebraic geometry, a morphism of schemes  from  to  is called quasi-separated if the diagonal map from  to  is quasi-compact (meaning that the inverse image of any quasi-compact open set is quasi-compact). A scheme  is called quasi-separated if the morphism to Spec  is quasi-separated. Quasi-separated algebraic spaces and algebraic stacks and morphisms between them are defined in a similar way, though some authors include the condition that  is quasi-separated as part of the definition of an algebraic space or algebraic stack .

All separated morphisms (and all morphisms of Noetherian schemes) are automatically quasi-separated. Quasi-separated morphisms are important for algebraic spaces and algebraic stacks, where many natural morphisms are quasi-separated but not separated.

The condition that a morphism is quasi-separated often occurs together with the condition that it is quasi-compact.

Examples

Any separated scheme or morphism is quasi-separated.
The line with two origins over a field is quasi-separated over the field but not separated.
More precisely  consists of two copies of Spec  glued together by identifying the nonzero points in each copy.
The quotient of an algebraic space by an infinite discrete group acting freely is often not quasi-separated. For example if  is a field of characteristic  then the quotient of the affine line by the group  of integers is an algebraic space that is not quasi-separated. This algebraic space is also an example of a group object in the category of algebraic spaces that is not a scheme; quasi-separated algebraic spaces that are group objects are always group schemes. There are similar examples given by taking the quotient of the group scheme  by an infinite subgroup, or the quotient of the complex numbers by a lattice.

References

Algebraic geometry